Simon Bening (c. 1483 – 1561) was a Flemish miniaturist, generally regarded as the last major artist of the Netherlandish tradition.

Bening, born either in Ghent or Antwerp, was probably trained by his father, illuminator Alexander Bening, in the family workshop in Ghent. He travelled between Ghent and Bruges and became a member of the guild of San John and Saint Luke in Bruges as an illuminator in 1508. He made his own name after moving to Bruges in about 1510, where he had lived since. From 1517 to 1555 he is listed regularly in the guild's annual accounts. Bening served as a dean of the calligraphers, booksellers, illuminators and bookbinders in the Guild of Saint John and Saint Luke three separate times (1524, 1536, 1546).

He was married twice and had six daughters. Two of them continued the family artistic tradition: Levina Teerlinc became a miniature painter, mostly of portrait miniatures, and emigrated to England, and Alexandrine Claeiszuene became a successful art dealer.

Works

Bening specialised in Books of Hours, but by his time these were produced only for royal or very rich patrons. He also created genealogical tables and portable altarpieces on parchment as well as oil paintings on wooden panels. He was known to extend miniature painting into the borders. His usage of illusionistic picture frames serve to function as small devotional panels. Many of his finest works are Labours of the Months for Books of Hours which are largely small-scale landscapes, at that time a nascent genre of painting. In other respects his style is relatively little developed beyond that of the years before his birth, but his landscapes serve as a link between the 15th-century illuminators and Pieter Brueghel the Elder. His self-portrait and other portraits equally are early examples of the portrait miniature.

He produced books for German rulers, like Cardinal Albrecht of Brandenburg, and royalty like Emperor Charles V and Don Fernando, the Infante of Portugal. Robert de Clercq, abbot of the Cistercian monastery of Ter Duinen ("Les Dunes") at Koksijde, near Bruges, commissioned a Benedictional from him sometime between 1519 and 1529. Bening portrayed the abbot in a colourful Crucifixion scene.

Bening’s usage of illusionism, pictorial narrative and creative adaptation demonstrates his influence from the leading illuminators, printmakers and painters of his near contemporaries such as Jan van Eyck, Mary of Burgundy, Martin Schongauer, Gerard David, and Albrecht Dürer.

Selected works
 Labours of the Months
 Munich-Montserrat Book of Hours
Codex of the Order of the Golden Fleece, Patrimonio Nacional, Spain.

Gallery

References

Sources

Hindman, Sandra et al. Illuminations in the Robert Lehman Collection. New York: The Metropolitan Museum of Art, 1997.
Morrison, Elizabeth and Kren, Thomas (eds). Flemish Manuscript Painting in Context. Los Angeles: J. Paul Getty Trust, 2006.

External links
 
 Gerard David: Purity of Vision in an Age of Transition, exhibition catalog from The Metropolitan Museum of Art (fully available online as PDF)
 The Hennessy Book of Hours, c. 1530–1540
 The Golf Book, c. 1540
 Book of Hours, c. 1525, from the collection at Waddesdon Manor
Grimani Breviary: a Remarkable Artistic Collaboration between Simon Bening and Other Artists

1483 births
1561 deaths
Flemish Renaissance painters
Manuscript illuminators
Painters by city